The Silver Branch may refer to: 

 Silver Branch, a symbol found in Irish mythology and literature
 The Silver Branch (Sutcliff novel), a 1957 historical adventure novel for children by Rosemary Sutcliff
 The Silver Branch (Kennealy novel), a 1988 fantasy novel by Patricia Kennealy